Oil India Football Club is an Indian professional football club from Duliajan in Assam. The club was founded by Oil India in 1964. It also participated in I-League 2nd Division, then second tier football tournament of Indian football league system, for three seasons. Oil India FC was nominated by Assam Football Association for the 2021 I-League Qualifiers but didn't make it to the final list approved by the AIFF.

History
Oil India FC is sponsored  by the public sector giant Oil India Ltd, as well as Ministry of Petroleum and Natural Gas. The club was set up in 1964 at Duliajan in upper Assam, although some administrative facilities are located in Dibrugarh. They took part in the first three editions of I-League 2nd Division. In 2010 edition, the club had progressed to final round but failed to qualify for the top tier. It competes in various local tournaments of the state including prestigious Bordoloi Trophy, Independence Day Cup, A.T.P.A. Shield, Bodousa Cup and Dibrugarh District Football League.
The club is considered to be one of the top teams from the North East India.

Stadium
Oil India FC plays its home matches at Nehru Maidan which is located in Duliajan. It has the capacity of 4,000 spectators and owned by Oil India Ltd itself.

Current squad

Kit manufacturers and shirt sponsors

Honours
This is a list of honours for the Oil India FC:

League
Assam State Premier League
 Champions (1): 2011–12	
 Runners-up (2): 2008–09, 2010–11
Assam Club Championship 
 Champions (3): 2002, 2003, 2007
 Runners-up (3): 1997, 2004, 2006

Cup
Bordoloi Trophy
 Winners (4): 1990, 2008, 2012, 2019
 Runners-up (4): 1979, 2003, 2018, 2021
ATPA Shield
 Winners (8): 1998, 1999, 2003, 2004, 2015, 2016, 2017, 2018
 Runners-up (3): 2000, 2007, 2022
Independence Day Cup 
 Winners (7):1976, 1977, 1994, 2004, 2005, 2016, 2022
 Runners-up (6):1979, 1990, 2002, 2003, 2008–09, 2013
Bodousa Cup
 Winners (3): 2010, 2015, 2020
 Runners-up (1)
Kalinga Cup 
 Winners (1): 2006  
Petroleum Sports Promotion Board Inter Unit football meet 
 Winners: 2006
Amba Medhi Football Tournament
 Winners (1): 2001
 Runners-up (1): 2008
Bodoland Martyrs Gold Cup
 Runners-up (1): 2018
Bodoland Gallants Gold Cup
 Winners: 2017
Swargadeo Sarbananda Singha Memorial Trophy
 Winners: 2010, 2021
Naroram Barman Memorial Trophy
 Winners: 2018, 2022
Sohanlal Dugar Shield
 Winners (2): 1975, 1997
 Runners-up (3): 2002, 2014, 2015

See also
 List of football clubs in India

References

External links 
 Official site of Oil India Ltd.
 Oil India FC at Soccerway 
Oil India FC on Facebook 
Oil India FC at Global Sports Archive

Association football clubs established in 1964
Football clubs in Assam
Dibrugarh district
I-League clubs
1964 establishments in Assam
Works association football clubs in India
I-League 2nd Division clubs